The Jelgava–Meitene Railway is a  long,  gauge railway built in the 20th century to connect Jelgava and Tilsit (now Sovetsk, Kaliningrad Oblast). Past the border with Lithuania, the line continues over Šarkiai to connect with the Vilnius–Klaipėda Railway at Šiauliai.

References 

Railway lines in Latvia
Jelgava
Railway lines opened in 1915
1910s establishments in Latvia
5 ft gauge railways in Latvia